Catherine Clark is an Australian sport administrator. In 2021, she was appointed the chief executive officer of Paralympics Australia commencing in January 2022. She has held several chief executive officer positions with state and national sports organisations.

Clark attended Caboolture State High School from 1991 to 1995, where she represented Queensland in hockey. Injury ended her elite hockey career. Between 1996 and 1999, Clark completed Bachelor of Arts in criminology at Queensland University of Technology and between 2010 and 2013 Masters of Business Administration at the University of Queensland.

Clark's sport administration employment has included:  Sport and Recreation New Zealand policy advisor, International Paralymoic Committee consultant, Gymsports New Zealand Chief Executive Officer (2007-2008), Gymnastics Australia Chief Executive Officer (2010-2012)  and Netball Queensland Chief Executive Officer. Whilst CEO at Netball Queensland (2015-2021),  the Queensland Firebirds. Under her leadership, the Queensland Firebirds won two ANZ Championships and Netball Queensland built the new $46M state-of-the art Queensland State Netball Centre.

Clark is an accredited Australian Institute of Company Director and been a director of the following boards - Hockey Queensland, Australian University Sport, Australian Commonwealth Games Association (Qld Division) and Shooting Australia.

Recognition 
 2016 - Queensland's Sport Administrator of the Year
 2019 - Australian Financial Review's 100 Most Influential Women for 2019.

References 

Living people
Australian sports executives and administrators
Paralympics Australia officials
Australian women chief executives
University of Queensland alumni
Queensland University of Technology alumni
Australian netball administrators
Australian female field hockey players
Sportswomen from Queensland
Year of birth missing (living people)